Asja Hrvatin (24 December 1990) is a Slovene writer and researcher, best known for her novels.

Life
Asja Hrvatin was born on 24 December 1990 in Ljubljana. She attended Tone Čufar Primary School in Ljubljana and later continued her education at the Poljane Gymnasium . In the academic year 2009/2010, she enrolled at the Faculty of Social Work at the University of Ljubljana. She graduated in Social Work and recently obtained an MA in Gender Studies. She is predominantly a feminist.

Works
The writer's first youth novel has the title From RTM to WTF and talks about the problematic theme of drug addiction. In April 2010, an article entitled "Democracy as a substitute for real life" was published in the Sobotna priloga Delo magazine . In 2010, she started writing her second novel entitled Lepe punce lepo bruhajo, which talks about the problem of Bulimia.

Books
 Od RTM do WTF, 2008
 Lepe punce lepo bruhajo, 2012

Research
 Gibanje za ustvarjanje novih prostorov skupnega in skupnosti, 2013
 Borders of social work: detention centre in the light of citizenship, criminalisation and state power, 2014
 Begunke v medijih: arhetip begunke kot žrtve, 2017

References

External links
Selected Works of Asja Hrvatin

Slovenian children's writers
Slovenian women children's writers
Slovenian women poets
Slovenian poets
Slovenian feminists
Slovenian editors
Slovenian women editors
1990 births
University of Ljubljana alumni
20th-century Slovenian women writers
20th-century Slovenian writers
Living people